The O'Duffy Cup is the prize presented to the winners of the All-Ireland Senior Camogie Championship.

The cup is named after Seán O'Duffy, a member and administrator of the Kilmacud Crokes club in Dublin, who presented the trophy to the sport's governing body, the Camogie Association of Ireland (Irish :Cumann Camógaíochta na nGael), now the Camogie Association or an Cumann Camógaíochta in 1932.

An updated cup, modelled on the Ardagh Chalice, was presented in September 2007, valued at €25,000 with Wexford captain Mary Leacy the first player to lift it. Wexford were crowned champions for the first time since 1975.

References

All-Ireland Senior Camogie Championship
Camogie cup competitions